Amia, commonly called bowfin, is a genus of bony fish related to gars in the infraclass Holostei. They are regarded as taxonomic relicts, being the sole surviving species of the order Amiiformes, which dates from the Jurassic to the Eocene, persisting to the present. There are two living species in Amia, Amia calva and Amia ocellicauda, and a number of extinct species which have been described from the fossil record.

Evolution and phylogeny
Competing hypotheses and debates continue over the evolution of Amia and relatives, including their relationship among basal extant teleosts, and organization of clades. Bowfin are the last remaining member of Halecomorphi, a group that includes many extinct species in several families. Halecomorphs were generally accepted as the sister group to Teleostei but not without question. While a halecostome pattern of neopterygian clades was produced in morphology-based analyses of extant actinopterygians, a different result was produced with fossil taxa which showed a monophyletic Holostei. Monophyletic Holostei were also recovered by at least two nuclear gene analyses, in an independent study of fossil and extant fish, and in an analysis of ultraconserved genomic elements.

The extant ray-finned fish of the subclass Actinopterygii include 42 orders, 431 families and over 23,000 species. They are currently classified into two infraclasses, Chondrostei (holosteans) and Neopterygii (teleost fishes). Sturgeons, paddlefish, bichirs and reed fish compose the thirty-eight species of chondrosteans, and are considered relict species. Included in the over 23,000 species of neopterygians are eight relict species comprising gars and the bowfin.

Infraclass Neopterygii
Neopterygians are the second major occurrence in the evolution of ray-finned fish and today include the majority of modern bony fish. They are distinguished from their earlier ancestors by major changes to the jaws, shape of the skull, and tail. They are divided into three divisions:
 Division 1. Order Lepisosteiformes – the relict gars which include extant species of gars that first appeared in the Cretaceous.
 Division 2. Order Amiiformes – the relict bowfin, (halecomorphids), the only extant species in the order Amiiformes which date back to the Triassic period.
 Division 3. Division Teleostei – the stem group of Teleostei from which modern fish arose, including most of the bony fish we are familiar with today.

Species
List of species.
 Amia calva Linnaeus 1766 (Bowfin)
 Amia ocellicauda (Eyespot bowfin)
 †Amia godai Yabumoto & Grande, 2013 (Miocene of Japan)
 †"Amia" hesperia Wilson (Eocene Okanagan Highlands)
 †Amia pattersoni Grande & Bemis, 1998
 †Amia scutata Cope 1875

Genome evolution
The bowfin genome contains an intact ParaHox gene cluster, similar to the bichir and to most other vertebrates. This is in contrast, however, with teleost fish, which have a fragmented ParaHox cluster, probably because of a whole genome duplication event in their lineage. The presence of an intact ParaHox gene cluster suggests that bowfin ancestors separated from other fish before the last common ancestor of all teleosts appeared. Bowfin are thus possibly a better model to study vertebrate genome organization than common teleost model organisms such as zebrafish.

References

Amiiformes
Ray-finned fish genera
Fish genera with one living species